Curtis Burrow is a former placekicker in the National Football League.

Biography
Burrow was born on December 11, 1962 in Brinkley, Arkansas, United States.

Career
Burrow was a member of the Green Bay Packers during the 1988 NFL season. He played at the collegiate level at the University of Central Arkansas.

See also
List of Green Bay Packers players

References

People from Brinkley, Arkansas
Green Bay Packers players
American football placekickers
Central Arkansas Bears football players
Players of American football from Arkansas
1962 births
Living people